Chenango Valley State Park is a  state park located in Broome County, New York in the United States.  The park is located adjacent to the Chenango River in western part of the Town of Fenton.

The park includes the 18-hole Chenango Valley State Park Golf Course.

Park description
Chenango Valley State Park offers a beach, picnic tables with pavilions, a playground, recreation programs, a 184-site campground, 24 cabins, sledding, a boat launch with boat rentals, and a food concession. Trails are available for hiking, biking, and cross-country skiing.

The park includes forested and wetland habitats; forested areas contain populations of woodpeckers, nuthatches, warblers and thrushes, while the lake and wetland areas host herons, ducks and kingfishers. The mature woodlands are noted for a particularly large number of pileated woodpeckers. For anglers, Chenango Lake includes trout, bass, perch and bullhead.

Two kettle lakes, Chenango Lake and Lily Lake, are found within the park. The lakes were formed as glaciers receded at the end of the most recent ice age.

The Chenango Valley State Park Golf Course is located within the park. The course, originally constructed as a 9-hole course by the Civilian Conservation Corps in the 1930s, was expanded to its current 18-hole size in 1967.

See also
 List of New York state parks

References

External links
 New York State Parks: Chenango Valley State Park
 Chenango Valley State Park trail map

State parks of New York (state)
Parks in Broome County, New York
Golf clubs and courses in New York (state)